Henry Ives Cobb (August 19, 1859 – March 27, 1931) was an architect from the United States.  Based in Chicago in the last decades of the 19th century, he was known for his designs in the Richardsonian Romanesque and Victorian Gothic styles.

Biography
Cobb was born in Brookline, Massachusetts to Albert Adams and Mary Russell Candler Cobb. Cobb studied at the Massachusetts Institute of Technology for one year then transferred to Harvard University where he graduated in 1881 with an engineering degree. After graduating, Cobb worked at the Boston architectural firm Peabody & Stearns before moving to Chicago in 1882. 

In Chicago, Cobb partnered with Charles Sumner Frost and formed Cobb and Frost. They designed the Palmer Mansion (demolished) on Lake Shore Drive; the Chicago Varnish Company Building—listed on the National Register of Historic Places and as a Chicago Landmark; the Episcopal Church of the Atonement at 5749 North Kenmore Avenue—also on the National Register of Historic Places; the Chicago Federal Building (demolished); the Newberry Library; the Fisheries Building (demolished) at the World's Columbian Exposition; and many pre-1900 buildings at Lake Forest College and the University of Chicago.  Elsewhere, he designed the Sinclair Oil Building (today the Liberty Tower), a Perpendicular-style skyscraper in downtown Manhattan, that was converted to residences in 1980; the Olive Building in St. Louis and co-designed the King Edward Hotel in Toronto.  Cobb moved to Washington, D.C., in 1897 to escape the Chicago grime, which damaged his cherished art collection. Cobb is responsible for The University of Chicago Yerkes Observatory in Williams Bay, WI, constructed from 1895 to 1897, with its Greco-Roman terra-cotta architectural detail.

Family
Henry Ives Cobb's grandmother, Augusta Adams Cobb, controversially abandoned her husband, Henry Cobb, and five of her seven children in 1843, and married Brigham Young as a plural wife.

Cobb and wife Emma Martin Smith had 10 children, seven of whom survived into adulthood. The children were: architect and author Henry Ives Cobb, Jr. (1883–1974), Cleveland Cobb (1884–?), Leonore Cobb (1885–?), Candler Cobb (c. 1887–?), Elliot Cobb (1888–?), Priscilla Cobb (1890–91), Alice Cobb (1892–93), Boughton Cobb (1894–1974), Russell Cobb (1897–?), and Emerson Cobb, (1902–10).

Works

See also
Architecture of Chicago
Cobb and Frost

References

External links
 Henry Ives Cobb papers, ca. 1907-1922. Held by the Department of Drawings & Archives, Avery Architectural & Fine Arts Library, Columbia University.

Architects from Massachusetts
1859 births
1931 deaths
People from Brookline, Massachusetts
Harvard School of Engineering and Applied Sciences alumni